These are just some of the landmarks of Milwaukee.

Buildings 

 100 East Wisconsin
 Allen-Bradley Clock Tower
 Burnham Street Historic District (Frank Lloyd Wright)
 Frederick C. Bogk House
 Germania Building
 Iron Block Building (Milwaukee, Wisconsin)
 Milwaukee City Hall
 Milwaukee Public Central Library
 Mitchell Park Domes
 Old Eschweiler Buildings
 Pabst Theater
 U.S. Bank Center
 Wisconsin Gas Building

Memorials 
 Milwaukee County War Memorial
 Holocaust Memorial

Museums 
 Milwaukee Art Museum
 Milwaukee Public Museum
 Charles Allis Art Museum
 Villa Terrace Decorative Arts Museum
 Milwaukee County Historical Society and Museum
 Discovery World
 Betty Brinn Children's Museum
 Captain Frederick Pabst Mansion
 William F. Eisner Museum of Advertising & Design
 Patrick and Beatrice Haggerty Museum of Art
 Harley-Davidson Museum

Sports venues

Active
 Miller Park
 UW–Milwaukee Panther Arena
 Helfaer Field – A Little League baseball stadium that occupies the infield area of the former Milwaukee County Stadium.
Fiserv Forum

Defunct
 Milwaukee County Stadium – Replaced by Miller Park. Most of the site was converted to parking for Miller Park; the infield area was reconfigured into Helfaer Field.
BMO Harris Bradley Center - Replaced by Fiserv Forum

Government 
 Milwaukee City Hall
 Milwaukee County Courthouse
 Federal Building

Bridges 
 Hoan Bridge

Churches 
 St. Paul's Episcopal Church
 Basilica of St. Josaphat
 St. Joan of Arc Chapel
 Church of the Gesu
 Three Holy Women Parish: St. Hedwig's, St. Rita's, and Holy Rosary
 Cathedral of St. John the Evangelist
 Old St. Mary's Catholic Church
 St. Stanislaus
 Greek Orthodox Church of the Annunciation
 Grace Lutheran Church
 St. Paul's Episcopal Church
 Trinity Evangelical Lutheran Church
 St. Adalbert's Catholic Church
 Calvary Presbyterian Church
 Immanuel Presbyterian Church
 Tripoli Temple
 Cathedral Church of All Saints
 Christ Evangelical Lutheran Church
 St. James Episcopal Church
 St. John's Evangelical Lutheran Church Complex
 St. Peter's Evangelical Lutheran Church
 St. Stephen Evangelical Lutheran Church

Public Art 

 The Calling
 Leif, the Discoverer
 Family
 Goethe Schiller Monument
 Gertie the Duck
 Bronze Fonz

Landmarks
Landmarks
Milwaukee